Iizuka Daiichi Gymnasium is an arena in Iizuka, Fukuoka, Japan.

References

Basketball venues in Japan
Indoor arenas in Japan
Rizing Zephyr Fukuoka
Sports venues in Fukuoka Prefecture
Iizuka, Fukuoka
Sports venues completed in 1972
1972 establishments in Japan